The Kennet and Avon Canal Trust is a registered charity and waterway society concerned with the protection and maintenance of the Kennet and Avon Canal throughout Wiltshire and Berkshire.

History 
In 1951, the Kennet and Avon Canal Association was formed with the goal of restoring the derelict Kennet and Avon Canal. In 1962 the organisation became a charitable trust.  After a campaign raising over £2,000,000, the canal was fully restored and reopened by Queen Elizabeth II in 1990. In 2013, the trust was presented with the Queen's Award for Voluntary Service.

See also 
 Kennet & Avon Canal Museum

References 

Charities based in Wiltshire
Waterways organisations in England